The Piece Maker 3: Return of the 50 MC's is the fifth studio album by American hip hop DJ Tony Touch. It was released on July 9, 2013 via Touch Entertainment and Red River Entertainment. 

Production was handled by The Beatnuts, A-Villa, Charli Brown Beatz, DJ Premier, Dready, Eminem, Erick Sermon, Just Blaze, Koolade, Lil' Fame, PF Cuttin, Statik Selektah, Thirstin Howl III, and Tony Touch himself, who also served as executive producer.

The album features guest appearances from Reek da Villian, Action Bronson, A.G., Al Joseph, Black Thought, B-Real, Bun B, Busta Rhymes, Crooked I, Eminem, Erick Sermon, Fat Joe, Ghostface Killah, Gob Goblin, Guilty Simpson, JD Era, J-Doe, Joell Ortiz, Kool G Rap, KRS-One, Kurupt, Liknuts (Tha Alkaholiks and The Beatnuts), Masta Ace, MC D-Stroy, Method Man & Redman, M.O.P., Noreaga, Papoose, Prodigy, Raekwon, Rah Digga, Roc Marciano, Royce da 5'9", RZA, Sadat X, Sean Price, Spit Gemz, Starvin B., Termanology, The Lox, Thirstin Howl III, Too Short, Twista, Uncle Murda, Willie the Kid, Xzibit and Angie Martinez.

Critical response

Upon its release The Piece Maker 3: Return of the 50 MC's was met with mixed reviews from music critics. Bruce Smith of HipHopDX gave the album three out of five stars, saying "while Piecemaker Vol. 3 has its highlights, it's not without its flaws. At times, the production of the Beatnuts (which covers most of the project) can feel dated, as do some of the featured emcees. Piecemaker Vol. 3: Return of the 50 MCs is a mixtape in its truest form, for better or worse. While some will champion this as 'true Hip Hop,' the abundance of filler can't be ignored".

Commercial performance
The album debuted at number 175 on the Billboard 200 chart, with first-week sales of 2,400 copies in the United States.

Track listing

Charts

References

External links

2013 albums
Sequel albums
Albums produced by Eminem
Albums produced by DJ Premier
Albums produced by Just Blaze
Albums produced by Erick Sermon
Albums produced by the Beatnuts
Albums produced by Statik Selektah